Kevin Graham (born April 21, 1986 in Regina, Saskatchewan) is a Canadian water polo player. He was a member of the Canada men's national water polo team at the 2008 Summer Olympics. The team finished 11th out of the 12 teams in the tournament.

Graham is slated to suit up for Egri Vízilabda Klub in the Hungarian League for 2010.  In 2008 and 2009 he played as a driver and hole checker for the club team PVK Jadran in Herceg Novi, Montenegro. Graham is enrolled in the Haskayne School of Business' Bachelor of Commerce program at the University of Calgary.

See also
 Canada men's Olympic water polo team records and statistics

References
Canadian Olympic Committee

External links
 

1986 births
Canadian male water polo players
Water polo players at the 2007 Pan American Games
Water polo players at the 2008 Summer Olympics
Water polo players at the 2011 Pan American Games
Olympic water polo players of Canada
Sportspeople from Regina, Saskatchewan
University of Calgary alumni
Living people
Pan American Games silver medalists for Canada
Pan American Games bronze medalists for Canada
Pan American Games medalists in water polo
Water polo players at the 2015 Pan American Games
Medalists at the 2011 Pan American Games
Medalists at the 2015 Pan American Games